Marcel van Cleemput (2 May 1926 – 15 March 2013) often known as Mr. Corgi was a French toy designer and author who worked mainly in England. He won the Toy of the Year award in 1965.

Early life
In 1935, aged 9, he journeyed to England with his father, speaking only two words of English "yes" and "Christmas. " He lived with his father in Yorkshire and attended Huddersfield Technical College from 1940, where he worked on aircraft design. In 1947, he served in the French Army, and attended officer training.

Career
In 1954 he joined Mettoy and designed the first Corgi model, of a Ford Consul. In 1956, he wowed the crowds at the British Industries Fair and continued to innovate technically. Notable models of his include the "Chitty Chitty Bang car, the 1966 Barris TV Batmobile and the Aston Martin DB5". He was with Corgi until it closed in 1984. His collection of prototypes and standard models was featured in two books that he published as well as for a while in a museum open to the public.

Sources

2013 deaths
People from Lille
1926 births
French Army soldiers
French emigrants to the United Kingdom
20th-century British inventors
20th-century French inventors
Toy designers